Road Rules: Northern Trail is the fifth season of the MTV reality television series Road Rules. It took place along the northern border of the United States, often landing the cast in parts of Canada.

Cast
This is the first season to have six cast members on Road Rules.

Episodes

After filming

Road Rules: Northern Trail is the subject of recurring jokes on various podcasts by Jim Sterling, owing to their co-host Jon Holmes having been a contestant in the series.

Roni Martin since got married and currently goes by Roni Chance. She worked as a photo editor for Hearst Communications since 2006.

Dan Setzler lives in Nashville and is focused on his music career.

The Challenge

Challenge in bold indicates that the contestant was a finalist on the Challenge.

References

External links

Road Rules
1998 American television seasons